NGC 736 is an elliptical galaxy in the constellation Triangulum. It is an estimated 200 million light years from the Milky Way and has a diameter of approximately 85,000 light years. NGC 736 was discovered on September 12, 1784 by the German-British astronomer William Herschel.

See also 
 List of NGC objects (1–1000)

References

External links
 

736
Triangulum (constellation)
Elliptical galaxies
007289